Leszek Herdegen (28 May 1929 – 15 January 1980) was a Polish actor. He appeared in more than 20 films and television shows between 1957 and 1980.

Selected filmography
 Rok pierwszy (1960)
 Kwiecień (1961)
 Nieznany (1964)
 Stawka większa niż życie (1967)
 Copernicus (1973)

References

External links

1929 births
1980 deaths
Polish male film actors
Actors from Poznań
People from Poznań Voivodeship (1921–1939)
Polish male stage actors
Recipients of the Order of Polonia Restituta (1944–1989)
Warsaw Uprising insurgents
Burials at Rakowicki Cemetery
Recipient of the Meritorious Activist of Culture badge